Rashtriya Chemicals & Fertilizers Ltd. (RCF) is an Indian central public sector undertaking which produces chemical and fertilizers and is based in Mumbai. It is under the ownership of Government of India and administrative control of Ministry of Chemicals and Fertilizers. RCF is fourth largest government owned-fertilizer-producer in India.

History
Rashtriya Chemicals and Fertilizers Limited, was established in 1978 consequent to the reorganisation of Fertilizer Corporation of India. RCF manufactures Urea and Complex fertilizers (NPK) along with a wide range of Industrial Chemicals. It is 4th largest Urea manufacturer in India after IFFCO, NFL and KRIBHCO.

The Government of India (through the President of India) holds 75% of the share capital of the Company as of December 2018.

Manufacturing Unit 

 Trombay Unit, Multiproduct integrated fertilizers & process chemicals factory in Mumbai spread across 800 acres (including township) ISO 14001,ISO-50001, OHSAS- 18001 & ISO- 9001 accredited, Manufactures Ammonia, Urea, Suphala, ANP, Methanol, Nitric Acid, Sulphuric Acid,Phosphoric acid etc.
 Thal Unit, Large producer of Urea along with Industrial Chemicals located 100 km south of Mumbai spread across 1200 acres (including township) ISO 14001, OHSAS- 18001 & ISO- 9001 accredited Manufactures Ammonia, Urea, Methylamines, Formic Acid etc.

References

External links
 Official website

Government-owned companies of India
Fertilizer companies of India
Chemical companies based in Mumbai
Chemical companies established in 1978
Indian companies established in 1978
1978 establishments in Maharashtra
Companies listed on the National Stock Exchange of India
Companies listed on the Bombay Stock Exchange